Woodchester Park is a  biological Site of Special Scientific Interest in Gloucestershire, notified in 1966.

Location and habitat
The site is in a secluded and sheltered valley in the Cotswold escarpment near Nailsworth. It overlies Jurassic limestone and clays. As a consequence it supports a diversity of wildlife and habitat associated with the woodland, grassland and wetland within this valley.

Flora
The site is mostly woodland and managed for timber production. There are remnants of the original semi-natural woodland (beech and ash with wild cherry and yew). There are nationally restricted plants which include fingered sedge, angular Solomon's seal, stinking hellebore and lily-of-the-valley.

Fauna
 Woodchester mansion - an unfinished 19th century mansion house within the park - supports a very important breeding colony of greater horseshoe bats, which feed in the surrounding cattle pasture. A long-term study of the bat colony was set up in late 1950s and continues today. The valley is also of outstanding invertebrate interest for butterflies, moths, dragonflies and some rare snails. There is abundant bird-life and breeding birds include sparrowhawk, green woodpecker and tawny owl. The lakes on the site are also used by overwintering wildfowl, and breeding species such as little grebe and mallard. There are also colonies of the yellow-necked mouse. Additionally, Woodchester Park is notable as the site of the Animal and Plant Health Agency long term study into the epidemiology of bovine tuberculosis in badgers.

.

References

External links
Woodchester Park official web site
Natural England (SSSI information)
Woodchester Greater Horseshoe Bat Project

Gloucester
Sites of Special Scientific Interest
Bat roosts
Tourist attractions in Gloucestershire
Stroud District
Sites of Special Scientific Interest in Gloucestershire
Sites of Special Scientific Interest notified in 1966
Cotswolds
Gardens by Capability Brown